Peer Polity Interaction is a concept in archaeological theory developed by Colin Renfrew and John Cherry, to explain change in society and material culture.

Peer-Polity Interaction models see the primary driver of change as the relationships and contacts between societies of relatively equal standing. According to the model set out by Renfrew, it encompasses three main sorts of interaction:

 Competition, including warfare and competitive emulation
 'Symbolic entrainment', where societies borrow symbolic systems wholesale from their neighbours, such as numerical systems, social structures and religious beliefs, because these fill a currently empty niche in their society.
 'Transmission of innovation', where technology spreads by trade, gift-giving, and other forms of exchange.

Further reading 
 Colin Renfrew, John F. Cherry (Eds.): Peer Polity Interaction and Socio-Political Change. Cambridge University Press, Cambridge 1986, .
 John Ma: Peer Polity Interaction in the Hellenistic Age. In: Past and Present. 180, 2003, S. 9–39.
 Anthony Snodgrass: Interaction by Design: The Greek City State. In: Ders.: Archaeology and the Emergence of Greece. Edinburgh University Press, Edinburgh 2012, S. 234–257.
 Summary of the article by Anthony Snodgrass:

Bibliography

Archaeological theory